Tyn-y-nant is an electoral ward covering the Tynant area of the village of Beddau, within the town and community of Llantrisant, Rhondda Cynon Taf, South Wales. It includes the area Gwaun Meisgin.

The population of the ward in 2011 was 3,547.

Electoral ward
Prior to 1996 Tyn-y-nant was a ward to Taff-Ely Borough Council and Mid Glamorgan County Council.

Since 1996 Tyn-y-nant has been an electoral ward to Rhondda Cynon Taf County Borough Council, electing one county councillor.

A by-election took place on 22 July 2021 to fill the post, following the death of Clayton Willis who'd represented the ward since 1995/6. The election was won by the Labour candidate, Julie Barton.

References

Wards of Rhondda Cynon Taf
Mid Glamorgan electoral wards